Jahan Najan (also Romanized as Jahān Najān; also known as Jahān Jān) is a village in Kiskan Rural District, in the Central District of Baft County, Kerman Province, Iran. At the 2006 census, its population was 163, in 46 families.

References 

Populated places in Baft County